Ekaterina Savova-Nenova (1901–1980) was a Bulgarian painter, married to Ivan Nenov, and an art teacher at the Institute for Teachers of Children in Sofia, Bulgaria. She was born November 13, 1901, in Sofia. She studied with Nikola Marinov at the Academy of Arts in Sofia, graduated in 1925, exhibited regularly with the Union of Bulgarian Artists, and had three individual shows in 1943, 1946, and 1958. Her paintings are exhibited in the Philippopolis Art Gallery in Plovdiv and the National Art Gallery in Sofia.

References

Further reading
 Ekaterina Savova-Nenova, Petŭr Dachev. Ekaterina Savova-Nenova, Bŭlgarski Khudozhnik, 1966.

1901 births
1980 deaths
Artists from Sofia
Bulgarian women painters
20th-century Bulgarian painters
20th-century women artists